Sigma Phi Epsilon Literary Society is one of three female societies at Illinois College in Jacksonville, IL. Sigma Phi Epsilon was founded January 22, 1916. Sigma Phi Epsilon is headquartered on the top floor of the David A. Smith house on the Illinois College campus.

History 

Throughout history, literary societies have played a key role in the development of speech education in America as well as significantly contributed to the evolution of a liberal system of collegiate education. Since their establishment, literary societies have provided a place to discuss topics of historical, literary, philosophical, and political interest. This escape was important for the students of Illinois College who were stuck in a conservative education system. Inside their society they could experiment with various techniques of rhetoric and explore taboo topics. The literary exercises that provided members with training and experience in speaking were debates, essays, declamations, and orations. Through these exercises, the literary societies of Illinois College – along with other societies across the country – helped change the future of the education system.

As the years went on and the education system loosened its strict reins, many societies died out because there was no use for them anymore. In spite of our changing society, literary societies at Illinois College have survived over the years and continue to thrive today. Sigma Pi, Phi Alpha, Gamma Nu, Gamma Delta, Sigma Phi Epsilon, Chi Beta and Pi Pi Rho are the last surviving societies at Illinois College and in the state of Illinois. Their traditions of speech training endure today in the form of literary productions where versions of debates, essays, declamations and orations are performed in front of an audience and judges. In addition to literary productions and other surviving traditions, the literary societies also participate in countless hours of community service and host joint events with each other. Even though the original reason for societies has faded away with time, they still offer their members the same life lessons and friendships and continuously provide the college with rich culture.

The history of Sigma Phi Epsilon started in 1903 when women were permitted to attend Illinois College. As the number of female students at the college increased, there became a need for more literary societies – female societies. In 1916, Sigma Phi Epsilon was the second of three female societies to be founded at Illinois College. 

The four founders, Lucy Gray Gatling, Frances Gatling, Bernice Wheeler, Anna Pessel met to organize a general plan for the new society. Bernice Wheeler was elected the society's first president.

Founders 
The founders of the female literary society, known as Sigma Phi Epsilon:  

 Lucy Gray Gatling
 Frances Gatling
 Bernice Wheeler (first president of Sigma Phi Epsilon)
 Anna Pessel

On January 22, 1916, the founding members along with a small group of interested girls met on the first floor of Academy Hall. It was decided that “the society would be founded not wholly as a literary society but for the purpose of bringing girls that they might be helped not only in their college life, but after they had finished college…the girls expressed it as their aim to unite with the other societies and friends of the college in making life more pleasant for the girls at Illinois College, and thus bring more girls to the college”. That day Sigma Phi Epsilon came into existence.

"Knowledge, Love, and Service" 
After Sigma Phi Epsilon was formed, a motto was chosen. The motto chosen for the society was “Knowledge, Love, and Service." 

 "Knowledge" - Sigma Phi Epsilon puts emphasis on academic excellence. All members work hard and take pride in attaining good grades. The literary society participates in at least three judged Literary Productions each semester at Illinois College. They strive for literary excellency and work on pieces to perform at each judged production.
 "Love" - Sisterhood is one of the most important parts of being a Phip. Being a Phip means having a wonderful group of women always there to support you. Sociability is also important to the society as they form strong bonds. Sigma Phi Epsilon strives to be a pleasant presence on campus. 
 "Service" - Sigma Phi Epsilon participates in service around the community that they love.
The first meeting of the new society was held around a round table. From this table, it was decided that the society pin should also be a circle to represent the complete circle of friendship. A pearl was added to the center to stand for the individual girl enclosed within the circle of friendship. The daisy was chosen as the society flower and yellow and white would be its colors.

During its first few years, Sigma Phi Epsilon used part of the first floor of Beecher Hall, Phi Alpha Literary Society's Trophy Room, for its meetings. The members, along with other women of the college, convinced the college that there needed to be a Women’s Building. In 1924, the David A. Smith House became the property of Illinois College and was given to the female societies to use as their meeting place. Sigma Phi Epsilon was given a large room on the second floor of the house and still resides there today.

Sigma Phi Epsilon still exists today after 105 years. Sigma Phi Epsilon Literary Society is founded upon a history of literary excellence, community service, academics, and sociability.

These organizations are deeply rooted in the life of the total college and are still units of campus rivalry as well as cooperation. Successful alumni of all ages help enhancing the prestige of their society in the eyes of the students. The time-honored ceremonies and traditional activities appeal to young people. The personal benefits are obvious. Whatever the reasons, literary societies have played an important role in the life of the college in the past and continue to be significant today.

Sigma Phi Epsilon Today (2021) 
Throughout the academic school year, Sigma Phi Epsilon participates in numerous community service projects including helping at the local soup kitchen, Big Brothers Big Sisters of America, volunteering at the Ronald McDonald House, and dog walking at the local Animal Control Center. Sigma Phi Epsilon members also continue to participate in judged Literary Productions. Active members are campus leaders, holding positions in campus organizations such as the Homecoming Committee, Student Activities Board, StudentForum, Student Senate, and more diverse, extra curriculum or organizations.

Achievements 
Sigma Phi Epsilon continues to show academic success in many ways. The literary society has had Illinois College's Female Literary Society GPA Award and the Service Award for excellence. Many alumnae of Sigma Phi Epsilon have also been a part of Phi Beta Kappa Society.

Notes
“Literary Societies” from Illinois College Comments

Hugo Hellman, “The Influence of the Literary Society in the Making of American Orators,” Quarterly Journal of Speech, XVIII (February. 1942), p. 14. Print.
Brockewitz, John. Rig Vega. Jacksonville: Illinois College, 1929. p. 165. Print.
Brockewitz, op. cit., p. 165
Brockewitz, op. cit., p. 165
Edwin A. Hollatz, Ph.D., “The History of the Literary Societies at Illinois College and Their Contributions to Speech Training in the Nineteenth Century,” (unpublished manuscript in the Illinois College Archives), p. 1. Print.

References

Literary societies
Student societies in the United States
Illinois College
Women's organizations based in the United States
Women in Illinois